Litterbug or Litter bug may refer to:

 One who litters in public places (see also litterbug word history)
 litterbug (band), a Canadian indie rock band
 Litterbug (comics), a Marvel Comics character
 The Litterbug, a 1961 Donald Duck short film
 Giant burrowing cockroach or litter bug, an insect native to Australia